The 2007 China Masters Super Series was a badminton tournament which took place at Sichuan Provincial Gymnasium in Chengdu, China, from 10 to 15 July 2007 and had a total purse of $250,000.

Tournament 
The 2007 China Masters Super Series was the seventh tournament of the 2007 BWF Super Series and also part of the China Masters championships, which had been held since 2005.

Venue 
This international tournament was held at Sichuan Provincial Gymnasium in Chengdu, China.

Point distribution 
Below is the point distribution for each phase of the tournament based on the BWF points system for the BWF Super Series event.

Prize money 
The total prize money for this tournament was US$250,000. Distribution of prize money was in accordance with BWF regulations.

Men's singles

Seeds 

 Lin Dan (champion)
 Chen Hong (first round)
 Lee Chong Wei (semi-finals)
 Chen Jin (first round)
 Chen Yu (first round)
 Bao Chunlai (quarter-finals)
 Peter Gade (semi-finals)
 Kenneth Jonassen (quarter-finals)

Finals

Top half

Section 1

Section 2

Bottom half

Section 3

Section 4

Women's singles

Seeds 

 Zhang Ning (final)
 Xie Xingfang (champion)
 Zhu Lin (first round)
 Huaiwen Xu (quarter-finals)
 Wang Chen (second round)
 Pi Hongyan (semi-finals)
 Yao Jie (second round)
 Lu Lan (quarter-finals)

Finals

Top half

Section 1

Section 2

Bottom half

Section 3

Section 4

Men's doubles

Seeds

Finals

Top half

Section 1

Section 2

Bottom half

Section 3

Section 4

Women's doubles

Seeds 

 Zhang Yawen / Wei Yili (quarter-finals)
 Gao Ling / Huang Sui (quarter-finals)
 Chien Yu-chin / Cheng Wen-hsing (second round)
 Wong Pei Tty / Chin Eei Hui (second round)
 Zhao Tingting / Yang Wei (final)
 Kumiko Ogura / Reiko Shiota (quarter-finals)
 Gail Emms / Donna Kellogg (semi-finals)
 Du Jing / Yu Yang (semi-finals)

Finals

Top half

Section 1

Section 2

Bottom half

Section 3

Section 4

Mixed doubles

Seeds 

 Nathan Robertson / Gail Emms (semi-finals)
 Xie Zhongbo / Zhang Yawen (quarter-finals)
 Zheng Bo / Gao Ling (champions)
 Nova Widianto / Liliyana Natsir (semi-finals)
 Sudket Prapakamol / Saralee Thungthongkam (quarter-finals)
 He Hanbin / Yu Yang (quarter-finals)
 Anthony Clark / Donna Kellogg (final)
 Thomas Laybourn / Kamilla Rytter Juhl (quarter-finals)

Finals

Top half

Section 1

Section 2

Bottom half

Section 3

Section 4

References

External links 
Tournament Link

China Masters
China Masters
2007 in Chinese sport